Xaverian High School is an independent Catholic high school located in the Bay Ridge neighborhood of Brooklyn, New York, serving grades 6 through 12, with 9-12 offering a college preparatory program and 6-8, a middle school.

History 
The school was founded in 1957 by the Xaverian Brothers. The school is a member of the Catholic High School Athletic Association (CHSAA). Xaverian is governed by a president and board of trustees. It is operated independently of the Roman Catholic Diocese of Brooklyn. As of October 2017 the school had a total student population of 1,045. 769 students identified as White/Caucasian, 149 as Hispanic/Latino, 68 as Black/African American, 41 as Asian/Pacific Islander, 2 as Native American/Alaskan Native, 1 as Native Hawaiian/Pacific Islander, and 15 as two or more races.

On March 5, 2015, the board of trustees made a decision to incorporate co-education to the high school, beginning in 2016. The school's first boys and girls class was admitted for the 2016–2017 school year. Xaverian High School also has a sister school located in Bruges, Belgium called the Sint-Franciscus-Xaveriusinstituut and maintains a yearly cultural exchange program with the school allowing exchange students to come to New York City in the fall and Xaverian students to go to Belgium in the winter.

Notable alumni 

 Tom Abinanti, politician, lawyer, member of the New York State Assembly, 1964
 Oday Aboushi, NFL player
 Brian Alvey, internet entrepreneur, 1987
 Rich Aurilia, professional MLB baseball player, 1989
 Michael Badalucco, Emmy-winning actor, 1972
 Scott Baio, actor, 1978
 Pedro Beato, baseball player
 Justin Brannan, New York City Councilmember for the New York City's 43rd City Council district in Bay Ridge, Brooklyn. 
 Jason Calacanis, internet entrepreneur (CEO and co-founder of Weblogs, Inc., CEO of Mahalo), 1988
 Bill Corbett, writer and performer on Mystery Science Theater 3000.
 Pete Davidson, actor, comedian, and cast member of Saturday Night Live, 2011
 Charles L. English, United States Ambassador to Bosnia and Herzegovenia
 Levance Fields, college basketball player, 2005
 Pedro Hernández, major league baseball player
 Christopher Hoban, NYC police officer, killed in the line of duty
 Mike Longabardi, NBA assistant coach, 2x NBA champion (2008, 2016)
 Ruddy Lugo, major league baseball player
 Chris Manno, retired MLB pitcher
 Ignacyo Matynia, actor, 2010
 Chris Mullin, "Dream Team" member and NBA player, former head coach of the St. John's Red Storm, 1981
 Tito Nieves, Latin music star
Sterley Stanley, member of the New Jersey General Assembly
 Chris Taft, NBA player, 2003

References

External links
Official site

Educational institutions established in 1957
Schools sponsored by the Xaverian Brothers
Boys' schools in New York (state)
Roman Catholic Diocese of Brooklyn
Bay Ridge, Brooklyn
Roman Catholic high schools in Brooklyn
1957 establishments in New York City